Peterson Electro-Musical Products, Inc. is a music-electronics company founded by Richard H. Peterson in 1948. The Peterson company introduced the first commercial handheld electronic tuner for musicians, the Model 70, in 1964, and later its models of strobe tuners became popular among touring and studio musicians such as the Grateful Dead, The Who, Pink Floyd, Queen, Frank Zappa, Jimi Hendrix, and Neil Young. Since its inception the company has also contributed notable inventions and innovations to the electronic organ, and its products are in use in many thousands of pipe organs, and hundreds of thousands of electronic organs, worldwide.

Company history

Founder
Founder Richard H. "Dick" Peterson (born February 26, 1925, died January 29, 2009), was born in Chicago. In his teens, he began developing a keen interest in radios, vacuum tube circuits, and pipe organs. He served as a radio operator for the U.S. Army near the end of World War II, and while stationed in New York City, developed a further fascination with the sound and mechanics of pipe organs. He founded Haygren Organ Company to build electronic pipe organs with a sound he felt better matched real pipe organs, and was the first to use multiple oscillators in the organ design to produce a genuine ensemble. He also focused on the realistic attack and decay of individual electronic notes.

Founding
Peterson founded Peterson Electro-Musical Products in 1948. He soon licensed his inventions to the Gulbransen Piano Company of Chicago to use in home electronic organs. In 1957, Peterson completed the world's first transistor organ for Gulbransen. The company went on to produce other products for musical tuning, electronic organs, home security, and keyboards, and later developed and produced electronic and electro-mechanical equipment used in pipe organs.

Expansion
They built two additional buildings totaling  on the company site between 1975 and 1977.

In 1985, the Conn Tuner company closed. Peterson bought their Strobotuner division, and continue to service the Strobotuner product line, which is now made in China.

More recent years
In 1991 Dick Peterson's son Scott R. Peterson became Company President, after previously serving as Design Engineer, Production Manager, and Vice President.

In 1998, the Peterson Company celebrated its 50-year anniversary by creating the "Beer Bottle Organ" prototype in the exhibit area of the American Institute of Organ Builders convention. The "BBO" used pipe organ components and beer bottles with liquid, precisely tuned with a Peterson strobe tuner, to produce a clear, flute-like musical sound when played with a keyboard or via recorded MIDI files. Peterson Electro-Musical Products, Inc. is still family owned, and still has an active research and development program for tuner and pipe organ-equipment product lines.

Tuner product history
The first Peterson tuner, the Model 150, was released in 1952, after Peterson developed it for their own use in tuning organs. The Model 150, and the Model 200 released in 1959 were the first products to carry the Peterson name. These tuners used vacuum tube technology and produced a wide range of finely adjustable audio tones. The design advanced to solid state with the Model 300 in 1966.

First handheld tuner
Peterson engineer, Bill Hass (born February 6, 1939, died May 3, 2008), built the first commercially available battery-powered handheld tuner, the Model 70, in 1964. The Model 70 was a chromatic tuner that generated twelve fixed pitch reference tones. The user tuning an instrument set the tuner to a pitch and matched the tone.

First Peterson strobe tuner
In 1967, Peterson introduced its first strobe tuner, the Model 400. It was the first solid-state strobe tuner on the market, and did not require calibration. Musicians could select one-cent increments. The tuner was highly influential in Peterson Tuner's growing presence in the fledgling tuner industry.

Tuning in the 1960s and 1970s

The rise of popular music as a business force in the 1960s and 1970s brought increased demand for professionalism in performance and recording. The only commercially available tuners in that era were manufactured by Peterson and Conn, which led to their presence on most major records and live concerts. The Peterson models became highly popular among leading touring and studio musicians, and were frequently used onstage by such bands as the Jimi Hendrix Experience, The Rolling Stones, Grateful Dead, The Who, Pink Floyd, Frank Zappa and the Mothers of Invention, Queen, Neil Young and Crazy Horse, the Bruce Springsteen Band, and many others. The tuner also became popular for precision tuning by school bands, top-level orchestras, and musical instrument manufacturers.

World's first LED guitar tuner
In 1980 Peterson introduced the Model 100 tuner—designed exclusively for guitars. The tuner used the strobe concept to create a rolling LED display that indicated pitch error by the speed of the rolling LEDs. The Model 100 sold successfully in the early 1980s and stayed on the market for nearly a decade.

Peterson Strobe Center 5000
In the 1990s, Peterson made the first significant change to the spinning wheel strobe since the late 1960s. They introduced the "Strobe Center 5000" (SC5000), which used twelve microprocessor-controlled digital stepper motors—one motor for each note in an octave. The strobe can change keys and temperaments, can store stretch tuning tables in a memory bank, and is a true polyphonic tuner. Widely used by school bands for its visibility and by instrument makers for its ability to show harmonic content, the Strobe Center 5000 remains Peterson's flagship strobe tuner.

AutoStrobe tuners series

After the Strobe Center 5000, Peterson Tuners re-designed their mechanical strobe tuning line and introduced a line of AutoStrobe series tuners. These selected the note automatically and offered programmability for advanced users. Besides the Strobe Center 5000, the AutoStrobe tuners are the only mechanical strobe tuners still made. Models include:
The AutoStrobe 490 - for tech benches, repair shops, factories—and rack-mounted (R490) for onstage use
The AutoStrobe 490ST - for tuning pianos and other instruments that require stretch tuning
The AutoStrobe 590 - for schools, band rooms, and orchestra halls

Virtual Strobe product line
In 2001, Peterson Tuners developed a line of Virtual Strobe electronic strobe tuners that use a LCD dot-matrix display to emulate a mechanical strobe disc wheel, creating a stroboscopic effect. Peterson began using the "Strobo" name for all of its new Virtual Strobe line of products. According to the company, this was a response to other manufacturers using the word "strobe" for non-strobe tuners. The Peterson 'strobo' tuner line guarantees 1/10th cent accuracy, or higher by using patented technology. Peterson claims the Virtual Strobe display delivers higher resolution than needle or LED-based tuners.
Peterson Sweetened Tunings

Peterson Virtual Strobe tuners offer specialized tuning solutions for various instruments, referred to by Peterson Tuners as sweeteners. According to Peterson, "sweetening" a tuning means using consonance and dissonance to affect the sound of a specific instrument, ultimately aiding creation of tension and release in music.

Peterson strobe tuners are loaded with presets that see a particular tuning as a group of notes (not just individual pitches) and, because of their high tuning resolution, can optimize the notes within these groups, making them more consonant with one another.

Peterson coined sweetening to distinguish between temperaments and 'other' exclusive sets of offsets. A temperament, by definition, implies the use of no more than 12 offsets, one for each pitch in the 12-tone chromatic scale. These offsets form a "template" octave. C0, C1, C2 through C8 for example, all have the same cent offset defined for 'C'.

Peterson "sweetened" presets are not temperaments because they do not necessarily pertain to a scale. They are sets of offsets for a particular instrument. The GTR sweetener, for example, accommodates the specific, common tuning problems inherent to a 6-string guitar. Unlike temperaments, the sweetener offsets only have musical benefit when applied to their intended instrument.

Virtual Strobe models
In 2001, Peterson introduced the model "VS-1" Virtual Strobe Tuner. The VS-II in 2003 had an improved display, additional features, and "sweetened" tunings. According to Peterson, it was also the first tuner to recognize and introduce dedicated tempered tuning presets for pedal steel guitar players. The V-SAM model, introduced later that year, added an audio output speaker and a metronome to the feature set of the popular VS-II. The VS-II was superseded by the StroboFlip in 2006.
StroboStomp

In 2004, Peterson released the Virtual Strobe tuner model as a stomp box format. The StroboStomp2 replaced the first model in 2007. Both models of the StroboStomp featured true-bypass technology that would not 'color' the tone of the connected instrument and offered a studio-grade, on-board DI (direct injection box). The StroboStomp was discontinued in 2007. The StroboStomp2 was discontinued in 2009 and replaced by the VSS-C Stomp Classic. The StroboStomp, according to Peterson,  was the first true-bypass tuner and the first strobe pedal tuner available commercially.

VS-F StroboFlip Compact Strobe Tuner

In 2006, the VS-II was replaced with the StroboFlip, a smaller version that could be used by musicians without a pedal board. It featured an innovative "Pitch Holder" that connected to the tuner with a tripod-like mount, allowing it to clamp onto music or mic stands. It is also the first tuner to specify the correct interval tunings for resophonic guitar and orchestral strings.

VS-R StroboRack Rack-Mount Strobe Tuner
In 2007, the StroboRack was introduced and featured a large 7" tuning display that made it easily visible from a variety of angles and environments. The StroboRack is the world's first single-space rack-mount strobe tuner.

StroboSoft Software-Based Strobe Tuner

In late 2005, Peterson Tuners announced the release of the StroboSoft, a software based strobe tuner that can be used on Mac or PC to tune on your computer. StroboSoft provides the same tuning accuracy as the hardware products and can be used as a stand-alone tuner or as a VST/AU (StroboSoft 2.0) plug-in. The software package contains utilities for tuning and sound analysis, including a spectrum analyzer, oscilloscope, and linear pitch graph.

BB-1 & BBS-1 Tactile Metronomes

In 2008, Peterson released its first standalone metronome called the BB-1 BodyBeat, a small battery-operated device which, in addition to displaying and sounding the beat, also included a vibrating clip. This clip, called the "Vibe Clip" enabled the metronome to operate silently, transmitting the tempo via a tactile pulse felt by the user when the vibe clip was worn close to the body. The BB-1 was superseded in 2011 by the BBS-1 BodyBeat Sync which expanded upon the concept by adding a more powerful metronome engine, wireless synchronizing of multiple units and the ability to store midi tempo maps.  In 2016 Peterson release the BodyBeat Pulse Solo, a vibing/tactile metronome that plugs into any audio metronome that has a 3.5mm headphone out jack including metronome apps.  The BodyBeat Pulse converts the audio to a pulse and has a built-in rechargeable battery to power it. 

VSS-C Stomp Classic

In 2010, the Stomp Classic replaced the prior StroboStomp2 product and added an improved DI, a larger display and multi-octave programmability. The stomp box design was also redesigned and modeled after the 1970s Conn ST-11 Strobotuner. It can connect to a computer via USB, and accepts altered tunings and sweeteners created on a special software editor made especially for the tuner.

SC-1 StroboClip Tuner
The StroboClip, introduced in 2010, is a clip-on strobe tuner. It contains preset sweetened tunings for a variety of acoustic instruments, but can be used for electric guitar and bass players during on-stage performance.  According to Peterson, the StroboClip was the first hardware tuner to feature the correct interval tuning for not just guitars and basses, but also for such diverse instruments as bagpipes, oud, banjo, sitar and Arabic maqamat (Eastern temperaments).

Mobile Tuning Apps for Apple Devices

Peterson Tuners released a Virtual Strobe tuning application in 2009 as a professional-grade tuning app for Apple's iPhone and iPod Touch. The application leverages the Virtual Strobe display and provides chromatic tuning with Peterson's renowned standard tuning resolution of 0.1 cent. In 2010, Peterson released a native iPad version that offers unique functions on the iPad platform that includes VGA output support for classroom usage and manual note selection. An adaptor cable designed specifically for use with the Apple devices was also introduced to support the app and offer users an entry-level package solution.  Per the iTunes store 7/14/2015, Peterson has renamed/created a new product for idevices called iStroboSoft. 
In 2014 an in-app purchase of Petersons exclusive Sweetener library was added.  The option of purchasing individual Sweeteners or instrument-based packs is offered.  The addition of other tuning scope tools available as in-app purchases was also added including harmonic tuning, oscilloscope, spectrum waveform analyzer, and a full-color spectrogram.
   
In 2013 a version of iStroboSoft was released for the Android market.  With a similar display to the ios version and the same 1/10th cent accuracy.  The Android version does not have the in-app Sweetener or tuning scope options.

SP-1 StroboPLUS HD Tuner

2012 was marked by the release of the StroboPLUS HD which sported a menu of 90 Sweetened Tuning presets and temperaments for individual instruments, some of which had never been preset in a tuner before. The device is audio-visual and also has the capability of being expanded to have metronome functions via an upgrade. The addition of a computer-aided USB user interface called Peterson Connect allows users to configure their tuner to their own requirements including such controls such as strobe speed, pattern and backlight behaviors in addition to programming temperaments and Sweeteners. Notably, The StroboPLUS can be programmed with up to 128 target pitches in one preset, these pitches can be placed within one octave or spread over several octaves - as the user wishes, thus making it suitable for regular as well as microtonal tuning.

StroboStomp HD Tuner
2019 marked the release of the StroboStomp HD.  This pedal tuner has a smaller footprint than its predecessor the Stomp Classic but a much larger tuning display.  The full-color LCD display allows assigning colors to the different settings you have for each instrument for easy recognition and to maximize viewing in your environment.  The StroboStomp HD offers pop-less true bypass, monitor mode or a buffered output.

Sponsors
The following is a short list of notable musicians who frequently use Peterson Tuners in their gear setup: 

Brian May
Carl Verheyen
Robert Randolph
Kirk Hammett
Pete Loeffler
LeRoi Moore
James Hetfield
Nils Lofgren
Dave Murray
Dave Ellefson
Edward Van Halen

See also
Strobe tuner
Pipe organ
Electronic organ

References

Further reading
Video: Peterson Tuners Classic Stomp (Joe Coffey of Premier Guitar, 2010)
Video: Beer Bottle Organ

External links

Peterson Electro-Musical Products, Inc.
ICS-4000 Integrated Pipe Organ System
Peterson Tuners on YouTube
Scott Peterson NAMM Oral History Program Interview (2013)
Pat Bovenizer NAMM Oral History Program Interview (2016)

Synthesizer manufacturing companies of the United States
Musical instrument parts and accessories
Electronics companies established in 1948
1948 establishments in Illinois